The Fayan, also known in English as the Model Sayings or Exemplary Figures, is an ancient Chinese text by the Han dynasty writer and poet Yang Xiong that was completed around AD9. It comprises a collection of dialogues and aphorisms in which Yang gives responses to a wide variety of questions relating to philosophy, politics, literature, ethics, and scholarship.

Contents
The text of the Fayan is divided into 13 chapters. It is presented in the form of dialogues between Yang and an anonymous interlocutor who asks him questions, to which Yang responds with terse, authoritative pronouncements that rely more on wit and puns than on logical exposition. The style is deliberately modeled on the Analects of Confucius and was intended to counter the ideas of the "syncretic" philosophical school, which Yang believed was contrary to the orthodox teachings of Confucianism and the ancient Chinese sages.

Translations
 . 
 . 
 . 
 .

References

Citations

Works cited

External links
《揚子法言 - Yangzi Fayan》 Chinese text with English translation by Bullock
Exemplary Figures 《法言》 Chinese text with matching English vocabulary

Confucian texts
Chinese philosophy
Han dynasty texts
1st-century books
Books of quotations